One member of the Manitoba Liberal Party was  elected to the Legislative Assembly of Manitoba in the 1999 provincial election.  Some of the party's candidates have their own biography pages; information about others may be found here.

Bob Brigden (Arthur-Virden)

Brigden is a farmer near Melita, Manitoba.  He was elected as a councillor in the Rural Municipality of Brenda in 1998, and was the first declared candidate for the 1999 Progressive Conservative nomination in Arthur-Virden.  He later withdrew from that contest, and sought and won the Liberal Party nomination instead.  Newspaper accounts do not indicate why he changed parties in the buildup to the campaign.  Brigden did not stand for re-election to council in 2002.

J. Deborah Shiloff (Assiniboia)

Shiloff is a neuroscientist, a Scientific Support Officer at the National Research Council of Canada's Winnipeg Institute for Biodiagnostics, and a member of the Neuroethics New Emerging Team (NET).  She received 1,136 votes (11.56%) in the 1999 election, finishing third against New Democratic Party candidate Jim Rondeau.

Peter Logan (Brandon East)

Logan has campaigned for Brandon City Council on two occasions.  He sold computerized cash register systems in 1999, and could not campaign full-time until the last two weeks of the election.  He later became president of the federal Liberal Party riding association in Brandon—Souris, and was one of Paul Martin's nominators for the party leadership in 2003.  Logan supported Michael Ignatieff's leadership bid in 2006.

Lisa Roy (Brandon West)

Roy (now Lisa Blixhavn) is a teacher, and an active curler.  She led the 1998 Manitoba women's junior champions at the 1998 Canadian Junior Curling Championships in Calgary, Alberta, and was a member of the runner-up team in the 2005 women's provincial curling championship.  She has remained active in the sport after suffering a serious eye injury in a 2005 accident.

Roy was a university student during the 1999 campaign.  She received 407 votes (4.09%), finishing third against New Democratic Party candidate Scott Smith.

Chris Hlady (Concordia)

Hlady has a Bachelor of Fine Arts from the University of Manitoba.  He has been a comic book illustrator, and has done video work.  He received 444 votes (5.47%) in 1999, finishing third against New Democratic Party leader Gary Doer.

Malli Aulakh (Fort Whyte)

Aulakh was one of five candidates for the federal Liberal Party nomination for Winnipeg South in 1993.  He was eliminated after the first ballot and gave his support to rival candidate Reg Alcock, the eventual winner (WFP, 25 March 1993).  He later attempted to challenge Kevin Lamoureux for the Winnipeg Centre Liberal nomination in 2000, but was unable to do so when the party ruled he had missed a filing deadline (WFP, 30 September 2000).

He received 1,202 votes (11.45%) in the 1999 election, finishing third against Progressive Conservative John Loewen.  In 2003, Aulakh was named to the board of directors of the Winnipeg Public Library (WFP, 24 March 2003).

Vic Wieler (Kirkfield Park)

Wieler campaigned ran for the Manitoba legislature in the 1995 provincial election, and finished second against Progressive Conservative incumbent Eric Stefanson.  He campaigned against Stefanson again in the 1999 election, and finished third.

In 2000, he was nominated as that Liberal candidate for a by-election in Kirkfield Park against new Progressive Conservative Party Stuart Murray.  He finished second with 2,158 votes (26.64%).

Previously a high-school principal, Wieler had become a financial planner by the time of the 2000 by-election.  He was also president of the Rotary-Club of Winnipeg Assiniboine at the time of the by-election (Winnipeg Free Press, 11 May 2000).  In 2003, he became a director of the Mennonite Central Committee's Furniture Thrift Store (Winnipeg Free Press, 12 November 2003).

Ajay Chopra (Point Douglas)

Chopra was awarded the National Indo-Canadian Council Distinguished Youth Entrepreneurship Award in 1998.  He was 22 years old at the time of the 1999 election, and finished a credible second against New Democratic Party incumbent George Hickes with 1,336 votes (21.35%).

Chopra was a special assistant to the federal Minister of Justice and Attorney General in 2002, and worked on Phil Fontaine's campaign to lead the Assembly of First Nations (AFN) in 2003.  Although he is not himself aboriginal, Chopra currently serves as the AFN's intergovernmental affairs advisor.

Betty Ann Watts (Radisson)
Watts was candidate for the Manitoba Liberal Party in two elections, 1999 in Radisson and 2003 in Transcona. Watts was a trustee in the Transcona-Springfield School Division from 1989 to 1998, and served as its chair prior to the 1998 municipal election (in which she was not a candidate). She supported greater parental involvement in school activities, and played an organizational role in Ukrainian language bilingualism programs.  In 1996, she was elected chair of the Manitoba Multicultural Resources Centre. She has also worked as Managing Editor for The Cottager magazine, and coordinated the 2007 Magazines Mean Business conference.

Cecilia Connelly (Rossmere)

Connelly has been a frequent candidate for the Liberal Party in the Rossmere constituency.  Her poor showing in 1999 may be explained by the fact that the New Democratic and Progressive Conservative parties were engaged in a tightly-fought contest, with both parties siphoning Liberal support.

Vibart C. Stewart (Transcona)

Stewart and his wife helped supply replacement workers to the Tache Nursing Centre in 1996, at a time with the centre's employees were on strike.  Vibart's wife, ironically, was herself one of the strikers.  He received 713 votes (8.10%) in 1999, finishing third against New Democratic Party incumbent Daryl Reid.

Rochelle Zimberg (Tuxedo)

Rochelle Zimberg has a master's degree in international relations theoryt. She was executive director of the Manitoba Association of Urban Municipalities during the 1990s, and argued in 1993 that the provincial Municipal Act was out of date and in need of revision.  She later sought a balanced approach on the use of Video Lottery Terminal revenues by municipal governments.  In 1997, she was appointed to an advisory committee overseeing the distribution of the Canadian Red Cross, Manitoba Flood Appeal Fund.  She was inducted into the Federation of Canadian Municipalities Roll of Honour in 1999.  Zimberg placed third against Manitoba Premier Gary Filmon in 1999'. after the original Liberal candidate stood from the contest. ms Zimberg ran again in 2000 and came in second to the conservative candidate.

Footnotes

1999